The South Africa women's national rugby sevens team competes at events within the World Rugby Women's Sevens Series and was a core team for 2014–15 season. They first played in the 2009 Rugby World Cup Sevens, and also competed in the IRB Women's Sevens Challenge Cup in the 2011–12 season.

South Africa did not qualify for the 2016 Rio Olympics despite winning the 2015 Women's Africa Cup Sevens because the South African Olympic Committee (SASCOC) rules states that teams cannot qualify by winning continental titles. As in 2016, South Africa missed Tokyo 2020 for the same reason.

Tournament History

Rugby World Cup Sevens

Commonwealth Games

Women's Africa Cup Sevens

2012 London Sevens
Group A

 26 - 5 
 28 - 17 
 41 - 0 
 21 - 12 
 22 - 0 
 19 - 14 
Quarter-finals
 - 
 - 
 - 
 -

Squad

Previous Squads

 Megan Comley
 Phumeza Gadu
 Veroeshka Grain (c)
 Jacqueline Kriel
 Unathi Mali
 Zintle Mpupha
 Marithy Pienaar
 Nadine Roos
 Mathrin Simmers
 Chane Stadler
 Christelene Steinhoebel
 Eloise Webb

Sunelle Barnard
Lorinda Brown
Kirsten Conrad
Phumeza Gadu
Rachelle Geldenhuys
Nosiphiwo Goda
Veroeshka Grain
Zenay Jordaan (c)
Jacqueline Kriel
Sinazo Nobele
Marithy Pienaar
Fundiswa Plaatjie
Mathrin Simmers
Zaandre Theron

Mandisa Williams
Ziyanda Tywaleni
Nwabisa Ngxatu
Nolusindiso Booi
Sinazo Nobele
Lamla Momoti
Zandile Nojoko
Phumeza Gadu
Zenay Jordaan
Aimee Barrett
Janine Felix
Cherne Roberts

References

External links
Women's national team at SA Rugby official website

Women's national rugby sevens teams
Rugby sevens in South Africa
W